Zelinski, Zelinsky, Zelinskii or Zelinskiy (Russian: Зелинский) is a masculine surname, a Russified form of the Polish surname Zieliński, meaning the color green. Its feminine counterpart in Russia is Zelinskaia or Zelinskaya. Notable people with the surname include:
Corneliu Zelinski (1899–1938), birth name of Corneliu Zelea Codreanu, Romanian ultranationalistic politician
 Daniel Zelinsky (1922–2015), American mathematician
 Dean Zelinsky, American guitar luthier
 Edward Zelinsky, American professor of law
 Edward Galland Zelinsky, creator of the Musée Mécanique
Elizabeth Zelinski, American professor, an expert in gerontechnology, neuroscience, and cognitio
Indrek Zelinski (born 1974), Estonian football coach and former professional player
Jeff Zelinski, former Canadian football defensive back
 Leo Zelinsky, a fictional character in the Marvel Universe
 Nikolay Zelinsky (1861–1953), Russian chemist
 Paul O. Zelinsky, American author and illustrator
 Susan Zelinsky, American vocalist who provided the vocals for the cover versions of the songs in Karaoke Revolution
 Wilbur Zelinsky, American  geographer

References